The second local elections in Iran, and the first to elect the members of provincial and township councils (Anjoman), were held in September
1970. 960 seats for 150 councils were up for election.

Results 
According to Rouhollah K. Ramazani, New Iran Party gained more than 60% of the votes and 300 out of 960 seats while Dishon et al reported the number of seats won by each party as the following:

By Province

References 

1970 elections in Iran
1970
September 1970 events in Asia